Archipimima yanachagae is a species of moth of the family Tortricidae. It is found in Peru.

The wingspan is about 23 mm. The ground colour of the forewings is cream grey with whiter transverse lines, brown suffusions and dark brown dots. The hindwings are pale dirty cream, tinged with grey and sparsely darker strigulated (fine streaks) posteriorly.

Etymology
The species name refers to Yanachaga–Chemillén National Park.

References

Moths described in 2010
Atteriini
Moths of South America
Taxa named by Józef Razowski